Doubletop Peak is a mountain in the state of Wyoming. The peak is the tallest in the Gros Ventre Range. Doubletop Peak is within the Gros Ventre Wilderness region of Bridger-Teton National Forest.

References

Mountains of Wyoming
Mountains of Sublette County, Wyoming
Bridger–Teton National Forest